Solmaz can refer to:
 Solmaz, Çınar
 Solmaz, Tavas

Surname 
 Abdulaziz Solmaz (born 1988), Turkish footballer 
 Esra Solmaz (born 1995), Turkish women's football striker

Turkish-language surnames